"(I'd Be) A Legend in My Time" is a song written and recorded by Don Gibson in 1960. It appeared as the B-side of his hit "Far Far Away", from the album Sweet Dreams. Gibson re-recorded the song on the 1972 album Country Green.

Ronnie Milsap Recording
The song was recorded by Ronnie Milsap and released in November 1974 as the lead single from his album A Legend in My Time. This was Milsap's sixth country hit and his third number one.  The single stayed at number one for a single week and spent a total of ten weeks within the top 40. Milsap's recording altered the song from its original 3/4 time signature to a 4/4 time signature.

Chart performance

Other cover versions
Frequently covered, the song is usually titled without the parenthetical lead. Versions have been recorded by
Connie Francis
Roy Orbison covered the track for his 1961 album Lonely and Blue, and recorded a second later version which was featured on his 1967 tribute album to Gibson, Roy Orbison Sings Don Gibson.  
Dottie West on her 1967 LP, I'll Help You Forget Her.
Johnny Cash (on the album American V: A Hundred Highways)
Waylon Jennings
B. B. King
 A live version by Tammy Wynette and the Good Guys on Navy Hoedown NH-21, among others.
A 1973 rendition by Sammy Davis Jr. became an Adult Contemporary chart hit, reaching #33 in Canada and #29 U.S.

References

1974 singles
Don Gibson songs
Roy Orbison songs
Dottie West songs
Sammy Davis Jr. songs
Ronnie Milsap songs
Songs written by Don Gibson
Song recordings produced by Tom Collins (record producer)
RCA Records Nashville singles
1960 songs